Ethan Winthrop is a fictional character on the NBC/DirecTV daytime drama Passions. Ethan is played by both Travis Schuldt (July 5, 1999, to July 3, 2002) and Eric Martsolf (July 8, 2002, to August 7, 2008). Rib Hillis temporarily portrayed the role in 2006 when Martsolf was on paternity leave. He was commonly known as little Ethan

Storylines

Early life
Ethan is the only child of Sam Bennett and Ivy Winthrop. He was born during the mid-1970s. His mother was deeply in love with his father, but Ethan's grandfather, former governor Harrison Winthrop, saw to it that the young lovers stay separated. Ivy and Sam discovered her father's treachery on Ivy's wedding night to Julian Crane, and the two made love, resulting in Ethan's conception. When Ivy learned she would have nothing if she remained with Sam, she chose to stay with Julian and pass Ethan off as a Crane.

As a Crane, Ethan lived a life of luxury and power. As Julian's first-born son, he was bred to be the heir to the Crane fortune. This, coupled with his mother's favoritism of Ethan over her other three children with Julian, caused Ethan's half-siblings to deeply resent him, especially his half-brother, Fox.

Unknown to him at the time, Ethan and Theresa Lopez-Fitzgerald once met each other when they were children, something that wasn't revealed until much later, and he was unknowingly in love with her since childhood. At the age of 12, Ethan met Gwen Hotchkiss at a joint mixer for both of their schools. The two became fast friends, and soon started dating. The two then went on to attend Choate Rosemary Hall boarding school.

Once out of high school, Ethan went on to attend an unknown undergraduate school and then Harvard Law School. After graduating from HLS in 1999, Ethan, now 24 years old, decides to move back to his hometown of Harmony with Gwen. He takes a job as the lawyer for Gwen's parents, spends some time in private practice, and then works for Crane Industries. He and Gwen leave and later return to Harmony that summer of 1999.

Ethan had loved Gwen from the time they were children, but he was reluctant to fully and finally commit to their relationship, until his aunt Sheridan pushed him into it. Knowing he was proposing for the wrong reasons, Gwen turned him down— she would not marry him, except for love, and opted to wait for a more sincere proposal. However, their prospective engagement was pushed to the back-burner when Ethan began being the victim of mysterious "accidents," and became determined to learn who was stalking him. With the help of private detective Frank Lomax, he eventually discovered that the stalker was Theresa Lopez-Fitzgerald, the daughter of the Crane family housekeeper Pilar. Theresa's teenage crush on Ethan made her clumsy and accident-prone in his presence.  Ethan befriended Theresa without knowing the depth of her feelings for him, all but oblivious as the starry-eyed ingenue assigned cosmic meaning to their every encounter and his every off-handed comment.

Theresa's conversational preoccupation with "true love" backfired on her, and moved Ethan to propose to Gwen; although the engagement was nearly a non-starter when the engagement ring which Ethan had insisted she try on became stuck on her finger—one of her several small-time plots to stall Ethan from marrying Gwen—but eventually, Ethan and Gwen celebrated their engagement.

Not long after becoming engaged to Gwen, Ethan began questioning his feelings for Theresa; his doubts culminated in his admission of his love for her at her hospital bedside as she struggled for her life after a motorcycle accident.  What would become the central motif of this triangle to date emerged when Ethan struggled to reconcile how he could fulfill his affection for and obligation to Gwen and also answer his inexorable pull toward Theresa.

Ethan eventually canceled his wedding to Gwen mere hours before the ceremony (and was disinherited by Alistair Crane for doing so); he proposed to Theresa in church, in front of all of Harmony, on Christmas Eve.

Paternity reveal and fallout
Early in the New Year, Gwen's mother, Rebecca, discovered that Theresa had information on her computer proving Ethan was not a Crane and, with Gwen's consent, sent the information to a tabloid, timing the announcement to coincide with Ethan and Theresa's engagement party. Gwen and Rebecca believed that Theresa was a gold-digger, and that once money was no longer part of the package, Theresa would leave Ethan. Rebecca assured Gwen that she, Rebecca, would marry Julian Crane and convince him to reinstate Ethan into the family, easing Gwen's guilt.

Theresa, convinced that it was only a momentary setback, stood by Ethan after he was stripped of all Crane rights and privileges, as he struggled to learn who had outed him to the tabloids, but she never revealed that she had known before the newspaper had created the scandal, nor did she suspect Gwen and Rebecca were to blame until much later. That summer, desperate to prevent Theresa and Ethan's wedding, Gwen once again contacted the tabloid and told them that the information had come from Theresa's computer, implying that Theresa, rather than Gwen and her mother, was the one who had revealed Ethan's true paternity.

The news broke on what would have been Ethan and Theresa's wedding day, and Ethan's mother, Ivy, was consequently so angry at Theresa that she crashed her car into the church to stop the wedding. Gwen's quiet insistence that Theresa had known the truth and hadn't told Ethan prompted to Theresa to run away, down the aisle; and Ethan, who maintained his faith in Theresa, tried to convince her that he still wanted to marry her but Theresa refused to listen to him and went to Bermuda, determined to get Julian to adopt Ethan and reinstate him as the Crane heir no matter what she had to do.

When Theresa returned from Bermuda having drunkenly wed Julian, Ethan forgave her and restored their relationship under the condition that there be no more lies; but Theresa kept one more huge secret from him—she was pregnant! The secret of the baby, presumed at the time to be Julian's since she was not far enough along for it to be Ethan's, was the final straw for Ethan; he broke off their relationship.

Ethan renewed his relationship with Gwen and remained bitterly angry for some time at Theresa — until pregnant Theresa confessed to killing Julian Crane. Ethan knew she was innocent and was covering for someone, but never realized that she believed she was covering for him (thanks to a fake videotape made by Rebecca, showing Ethan killing Julian). When Theresa was found guilty and sentenced to death, Ethan helped her run from the law, taking her to the Crane cabin, where she went into labor. She hid her labor pains, using all the time she had to convince Ethan that they could still have a future; it took the arrival of Gwen, who quickly realized Theresa was in labor, to allow for the delivery of Theresa's son, whom she named for Ethan. Ethan later became godfather to "Little Ethan".

The police took Theresa back to Harmony, where Theresa was "executed"; her execution was in fact a ploy to convince still-living Julian, who believed Theresa had shot him, that it was safe to come back to Harmony. Ethan had been devastated, and was greatly relieved that Theresa was alive, and he quickly became enamored with her son; although he'd purchased an engagement ring for Gwen, he began to imagine a future with Theresa again... until the revelation of Gwen's pregnancy spurred Ethan to reassess and commit to Gwen and their unborn child. Gwen didn't want to marry for the baby alone; Ethan convinced her that his feelings for Theresa were over, and his loyalty would thereafter be to Gwen. Despite some last-minute attempts at interference by Theresa, Ethan and Gwen were married in December 2002.

Marriage to Gwen

Sarah's stillbirth
Gwen's difficult pregnancy led the couple to travel to L.A. in the summer of 2003 (a summer which lasted well into October, in real time) to visit specialists; unluckily for all of them, Theresa, who had been trying to get over Ethan and give them space while Gwen's health was fragile, had left Harmony for L.A., as well.

Ethan's devotion to his wife was shaken by the proximity of Theresa, and he found himself repeatedly drawn to her, jealous of her new relationship with his brother Fox Crane and tortured by memories of their past.  The two shared passionate kisses on the beach in L.A., which were unfortunately caught on camera by a news reporter; when Gwen saw her husband with Theresa on camera, she left the hospital looking for her husband. A confrontation with Theresa led to Gwen being hospitalized. The doctors at the hospital informed Ethan that he had to choose between his wife and unborn child but before Ethan could choose, the doctors came and told him that they had lost the baby. Gwen and Ethan later named their daughter Sarah. Upon returning to Harmony, Ethan swore to his grief-stricken wife on their daughter's casket that Theresa was out of his life for good.

Jane's birth and custody battles
Gwen, angry at Theresa for her role in causing her daughter's death (which would prevent her from carrying any further children), colluded with her mother in causing the courts to take Theresa's son from her; Ethan, bound by his promise on his daughter's grave, was powerless to openly help Theresa, and contented himself with working with Theresa's lawyer secretly to help her regain custody.  Once Julian (then considered Little Ethan's biological father) and his wife, Rebecca, gained custody, Ethan agreed with Gwen that they were inappropriate parents, and agreed that he and Gwen should take custody of the boy in the stead of Rebecca and Julian; and so Rebecca and Gwen's plan of giving Gwen Theresa's son to raise was accomplished. Around this same time, Gwen was attempting to find a surrogate mother for herself and Ethan (after the fight/accident with Theresa in L.A., most of Gwen eggs were no longer viable, and she could not carry a baby herself...however, another woman could carry the child if some of Gwen's eggs were fertile).

Theresa, believing that without Ethan's help she'd never regain custody of her son, resorted to stealing Ethan and Gwen's embryo and having herself implanted with it, intending to exchange their child for hers once it was born.  But when she believed she had miscarried the baby, she sank to still more desperate measures; after slipping a dangerous date rape drug into Ethan's drink, she dressed up as Gwen, climbed into his bed and had sex with him. Though Ethan knew it was her and denied it until after Jane was born.

It was soon discovered that Theresa was in fact carrying twins, although, because Theresa had had a one-night stand with Fox, both the maternity and paternity of the twins was in question. After being informed by Dr. Eve Russell her body was unable to successfully carry both children to term she was given the option of medical abortion, which would kill one fetus, while ensuring the other would live. At Gwen and Ethan's insistence, Theresa agreed to have the baby with the best chances of survival be saved.

After delivering a healthy baby girl prematurely less than a month later, DNA testing proved Theresa to be the biological mother of the little girl, and Ethan the father, much to Gwen's outrage. Theresa later decided to name their daughter Jane Winthrop after the novel Jane Eyre.

Gwen became mad with grief, and stabbed Theresa in the back with a hospital scalpel. She was arrested and put in jail, while Theresa fell into a coma. Ethan was devastated for both women, and torn once again by his love for and obligations to each. Theresa woke, but was paralyzed.

Gwen, who was hospitalized after a suicide attempt and was suffering from elaborate delusions about her unborn children, later kidnapped Jane and hid her in the Crane cabin before absconding on the Crane jet with Katherine Crane. Ethan and Theresa led a frantic search for their child, growing closer while attempting to locate Gwen and their daughter. At the same time, Ethan also began growing closer to his father and paternal half-siblings. After learning his half-sister Jessica Bennett had been assaulted, he, along with Chad Harris, and Fox Crane tarnished and destroyed the nightclub in which it occurred.

Soon Ethan, Theresa and Fox learned Gwen, Jane, and Katherine were being held prisoner by Alistair at the Crane Compound. They rescued them from the Compound, reuniting Ethan and Theresa with their daughter. Ethan had planned to sue for custody of Jane, but offered to let Theresa keep their daughter if she would end the war with Gwen. But Theresa pressed charges against Gwen hoping that Ethan would turn to her with Gwen in prison, and Ethan sued for custody as he had originally intended. Gwen was acquitted once it was revealed that a drug interaction had caused her behavior, and the judge gave custody to Ethan and Gwen, in part because of the method Theresa used to conceive the child.

Shortly after the court decision, a heartbroken Theresa accused Ethan of stealing her baby from her; Ethan admitted to Theresa that he loved her and wanted to be with her and her two children, but could never break his marriage vows to do it.

That summer, Harmony was struck by an earthquake and tsunami, and Ethan saved Theresa's life numerous times; Theresa's belief that this proved their connection and commitment, though, was met by Ethan's insistence that they keep their love "bottled up" in deference to his marriage.

While Ethan served as Eve Russell's lawyer (she was on trial for attempted murder; a mistrial was eventually declared), a desperate Theresa married Alistair Crane in order to move into the Crane Mansion to look for clues to prove her innocence in the old matter of the tabloid scandal and to regain contact with Jane. Ethan was appalled by her actions, considering marriage to Alistair a deal with the devil. He softened however, after learning Theresa was being raped night after night by Alistair, and offered to help her leave Harmony, which she refused to do after Alistair adopted her son. Theresa's many attempts to kill Alistair were thwarted, but Ethan nearly became a victim of the final one; she had poisoned guacamole with aspirin and Ethan, after eating it, collapsed, became comatose, and was declared brain-dead.

Gwen decided to take Ethan off life support as per his wishes, but Theresa wouldn't hear of it and enlisted the help of Noah Bennett to help her kidnap Ethan. When everybody's backs were turned Theresa and Noah took Ethan from the hospital and took him to the Crane Cabin. Gwen eventually found them and took Ethan back to the hospital where she still planned to let Ethan go, but decided to wait until after Christmas. At the Christmas Eve service Theresa prayed to God that if he would bring Ethan back she would leave Gwen and Ethan alone forever. Just as the service began Ethan entered the church alive and well. Ethan forgave Theresa for accidentally poisoning him, and it was revealed that his supposed "brain-dead" state had been a trick of Alistair's, which is how Ethan became one of the suspects at Alistair's New Year's Eve "Murder Party" when the man was found stabbed.  He was soon cleared, and it was discovered (only by Julian) that Liz had been the one to stab Alistair, for raping her many years before.

Ethan found himself in the position of having to resist Theresa's constant advances, as Theresa, realizing Ethan would never leave his wife for her, offered to become his mistress. Gwen urged Ethan to make a total break and the couple resolved to move to India but were stopped when Theresa was named in Alistair's will as the heir to the Crane Empire; she used her newfound resources to ground the plane Gwen and Ethan had already boarded for India, and to prevent Ethan from getting jobs elsewhere.

Ethan, Gwen and Jane set up house at Grace's B&B to get out of Theresa's sphere of influence; but the move was to no avail. Theresa arranged a demanding job for Gwen at Collier & Co., to drive a wedge between Gwen and Ethan, while Ethan, refusing Theresa's extravagant offers of co-chairmanship of Crane Industries—which would have allowed him to fulfill the idealistic plans he'd once had as Crane heir—resorted to working in a garage. Soon mysterious events were drawing the residents of Harmony to Rome. Theresa found out that Jessica, Paloma, and Simone were in danger there and asked Ethan to accompany her to Italy to save his half-sister, and Ethan agreed. Ethan and Theresa were forced to stay in a hotel suite together when Theresa received an e-mail telling her that someone from Harmony would die in Rome. Ethan wanted to be near Theresa to protect her. Very soon Theresa found J.T. Cornell, the editor of the tabloid in which Ethan's paternity was revealed. Theresa got the evidence she needed to show him that it was Gwen and Rebecca who set the truth of Ethan's paternity to the tabloids. But soon Rebecca called J.T. and convinced him to take the evidence and run. J.T. managed to get away from Theresa in time. Ethan was convinced she was lying and stormed out on her.

Jealousy of Jared
After Theresa finally gave up on Ethan, Ethan became upset and very jealous of Jared Casey. When Pilar (Theresa's Mother) was shot Ethan went to see her, she told him to leave Gwen and go be a family with Theresa, Little Ethan and Jane. Later on, Theresa and Jared were staying at the same hotel as Ethan and Gwen. Ethan accidentally crawled into Theresa's bed. They were both drunk and he thought that she was Gwen and Theresa thought that he was Jared. They ended up having sex. Not long after the two knowingly began a short affair. Ethan always admitted his love for Theresa, and he was convinced that Jared was a criminal (but couldn't prove it to Theresa).

Divorce and return to Theresa
Early in the New Year, the Blackmailer drugged Ethan and induced him to crawl into bed with Theresa, presumably so that Gwen, upon catching them, would leave Ethan once and for all—which is what happened.  Gwen left Ethan and Jane at the end of January 2007, despairing that he would always love Theresa, and declaring that she deserved a man who loved her alone.

The same incident threw a wrench in Theresa's relationship with Jared, during which time (the day after Gwen left him), Ethan moved into the Crane mansion so that Theresa could help him take care of Jane.  Ethan and Theresa appeared to be on track to finally renew their old relationship—only the secret Theresa had been keeping from Ethan regarding their son's paternity stood in the way—but before she could tell him, she began being blackmailed by the same entity that had drugged Ethan and which had framed her brother Luis for multiple crimes he hadn't committed (while her brother Miguel had similarly been set up by Julian and Fox Crane).  Ethan was forced to watch in frustration as Theresa withdrew from him, allowing herself to be coerced into marrying Jared Casey, all because the mysterious blackmailer apparently wants Ethan for himself.

Despite Ethan's efforts to unmask the blackmailer and exonerate Luis, he's been unsuccessful; as her brothers' attorney, he was frustrated by sham court proceedings, controlled by the blackmailer, which culminated in Luis being sentenced to death and Miguel to life in prison.  Theresa has repeatedly underscored the necessity, per the blackmailers' orders, of committing to her new husband—a claim which Ethan has repeatedly rejected, going so far as to kidnap Theresa and take her to one of Alistair's hidden safe rooms so they could make love, hiring a look-alike to impersonate him so they could be alone without fear and to draw out the blackmailer, and demanding to know her secret to end the blackmailers' hold on her.

Ethan's efforts have not been without their risks; for continuing to see one another covertly, the blackmailer has punished Ethan and Theresa by crushing Ethan between two walls, threatening Theresa at knifepoint, trapping the pair in the Crane Mausoleum and setting fire to it, and demanding that Theresa conceive her husband (Jared Casey)'s child. Believing they were about to die, Theresa confessed the truth about their son to Ethan in the Crane Mausoleum; but he passed out before he heard it, and remains ignorant of her secret. But her secret is increasingly in danger, as, rapidly, more people have learned it—Pilar, Chad, Whitney, Julian (with whom Theresa made a business bargain to ensure his silence), and Father Lonigan (who set Theresa's penance as telling Ethan the truth); her secret is also one of the many that is on J.T. Cornell's USB stick, which was recently discovered by Gwen and Rebecca hidden in Theresa's office. They, too, now know her secret, and have stated the intention of using it to ruin Ethan's relationship with Theresa - and to ruin Theresa for good. Despite Theresa's secret and the fact that both she and Ethan remain married to other people, Theresa accepted Ethan's proposal of marriage on June 27, 2007; upon finding out about her continued relationship with Ethan, Jared gracefully bowed out of the picture and wished Theresa every happiness, while Ethan's wife, Gwen, has also signed her divorce papers.

NBC finale
On August 17, 2007, it was revealed that Alistair was in fact alive; it was soon established that Alistair had not only been responsible for twisting grandson Vincent's already fragile psyche, but had also been behind Vincent's actions as the Blackmailer. Vincent told Alistair of the secret that he had learned — that Little Ethan had been fathered by Ethan, not Julian — and Alistair was enraged that Theresa had duped him. Theresa finally married Ethan on August 20, 2007. Gwen tried to stop the wedding and honeymoon by telling Ethan the truth, but was stopped by Alistair, who wanted to keep Little Ethan's real paternity a secret to protect his corporate interests. Alistair's attempt to poison Theresa put Ethan in a coma instead. With Alistair now known to be alive, Rebecca Hotchkiss noted in the August 23, 2007 episode that "if Alistair's not dead, then Theresa's marriage to Ethan is not legal. She is a bigamist." Alistair reminded Theresa that he was her legal husband and, fearful of being made a laughingstock for making a non-Crane his heir, threatened to harm her if she told anyone about Little Ethan's paternity.

On August 29, 2007, Theresa finally revealed to an unconscious Ethan that he had a son during his hospitalization for the poisoning.  The next day a nurse told Theresa that she believed Ethan could indeed hear everything Theresa said. Theresa tested this by asking Ethan to squeeze her hand, which he did.  After Ethan woke up from his coma, he revealed he had heard Theresa's revelation that he has a son (although she had failed to mention his son's name or that she was the mother).  The two were overjoyed.  Theresa finally asked Pilar to go get Little Ethan.  As Pilar and Little Ethan walked into the hospital room, Gwen entered with a surprise.  She handed Ethan a baby boy and said, "This is your son, our son, yours and mine". The NBC run of Passions ended with Ethan holding the baby, Gwen smirking at her rival, and Theresa looking horrified.

DirecTV storylines
Devastated to learn Gwen allegedly had a son Jonathan Winthrop with Ethan, Theresa once again decided to tell the truth of her son's paternity only to be threatened by Gwen and Alistair into backing down. Ever relentless, Theresa planned on telling Ethan until her own mother begged her not to, eventually admitting that Gwen and Rebecca were blackmailing her because of her involvement in the massacre of the Vasquez family in Mexico twenty-five years before. An embittered Juanita Vasquez blamed Pilar, and threatened to exterminate the entire Lopez family, just as Juanita's had been. Theresa could not tell Ethan the truth even when Jonathan in need of a liver donor needed the help of a sibling. When Jane failed to be used, Theresa arranged for her son Little Ethan to be used in the procedure, unfortunately, she had to keep telling Ethan lies, infuriating him. Gwen took advantage of the situation by telling Ethan that Theresa had another lover.

In February 2008, Ethan, Luis, and Miguel learned that Theresa and Pilar were being held hostage in Mexico by Juanita Vasquez. The group arrived just as Juanita caused an explosion to destroy the boat both Pilar and Theresa were on. Ethan and Luis both swam to the wreckage where Pilar was recovered and taken back to shore, while Theresa struggled to keep herself alive in the shark infested waters. Ethan and Theresa were briefly reunited only to have Theresa pulled further out to sea as Ethan was pulled under and caught in the wreckage. As everyone awaited news of Theresa's fate a rescue worker came with news that Theresa's bloody and torn blouse had washed up on shore and her family was grief-stricken by the news. Ethan took this especially hard and said a tearful goodbye to the only woman he had ever loved.

At the prompting of his mother, Ethan decided to stay with Gwen for the sake of his children. Gradually Ethan began to take notice of the children's nanny Gertrude, and the two bonded with he not realizing Theresa was in disguise all along. Theresa and Ethan were finally reunited in the August 4, 2008 episode of Passions. Theresa, knowing Juanita had been caught, finally told Ethan that Little Ethan is his biological son and not Julian's as was always believed. Soon after, Little Ethan, with Rebecca on his heels rushed into the basement with the camera holding the proof of the secrets and lies Gwen and Rebecca had plotted to keep Ethan and Theresa apart. After a mishap with the camera Little Ethan was finally able to fix it and Sam appeared with the camera in hand as it began to play the recording of the plots hatched by Gwen and Rebecca, who were then arrested on many criminal charges including fraud, bribery, and attempted murder of not only Pilar's sister and nephews in Mexico, but also everyone in the basement of the church. Ethan furiously denounced Gwen and Rebecca and reunited with Theresa. As imminent doom hovered over Harmony in the form of an erupting volcano, Tabitha was baptized with everyone present and Gwen and Rebecca began arguing over a trip to Las Vegas that Gwen didn't remember, where it was revealed that Gwen had married an unknown man while drunk and the marriage was never annulled or divorced. This occurred before Ethan and Gwen were married in 2002, thus nullifying their marriage.

With Gwen's marriage invalid, and Alistair Crane murdered by Viki Chatsworth three months before, Theresa and Ethan were married in a church ceremony as they both had dreamed of in front of family and friends at St. Margaret Mary's church on August 7, 2008.

See also
Bennett and Standish families
Lopez-Fitzgerald family

External links

soapcentral.com|PS Online
Ethan at Soap Central

References

Passions characters
Fictional lawyers
Fictional Harvard University people
Fictional businesspeople
Male characters in television
Television characters introduced in 1999